The Apostolic Prefecture of Xing'anfu or Apostolic Prefecture of Ankang is a Latin Catholic pre-diocesan jurisdiction located in Shaanxi. It depends directly on the Holy See and its missionary Dicastery for Evangelization.

History
 28 March 1928: Established as Apostolic Prefecture of Xing’anfu from then the Apostolic Vicariate of Hanzhong and  Apostolic Vicariate of Xi’anfu.

Prelates
 Prefects Apostolic of Xing’anfu (Roman Rite)
 Fr. Giovanni Soggiu, O.F.M.Conv. (1 Aug 1928 – 12 Nov 1930)
 Fr. Berardo Barracciu, O.F.M.Conv. (26 Feb 1932 – 3 Sep 1940)
 Fr. Emilio Favarato, O.F.M.Conv. (20 Jun 1941 – 1946)
 Fr. Pietro Maleddu, O.F.M.Conv. (7 May 1948 – 1983)
 Fr. John Baptist Ye Ronghua, administrator (1987 – 10 Dec 2000)
 Bishop John Baptist Ye Ronghua (10 Dec 2000 – 28 Aug 2022)
 Bishop John Wang Xiaoxun, coadjutor (30 Nov 2016 – 28 Aug 2022)
 Bishop John Wang Xiaoxun (since 28 Aug 2022)

See also
Roman Catholicism in China

References

External links
 GCatholic.org
 Catholic Hierarchy

Apostolic prefectures
Roman Catholic dioceses in China
Christianity in Shaanxi